is a Japanese manga series written and illustrated by Atsushi Ohkubo. Set at the "Death Weapon Meister Academy", the series revolves around three teams, each consisting of a weapon meister and (at least one) weapon that can transform into a humanoid. Trying to make the latter a "death scythe" and thus fit for use by the academy's headmaster Shinigami, the personification of death, they must collect the souls of 99 evil humans and one witch, in that order; otherwise, they will have to start all over again.

The manga was preceded by three separate one-shots published by Square Enix in 2003; the first two published in two Gangan Powered special editions and the last one in Gangan Wing. Soul Eater was regularly serialized in Square Enix's Monthly Shōnen Gangan magazine from May 2004 to August 2013. Its chapters were collected in twenty-five tankōbon volumes. A fifty-one episode anime television series adaptation produced by Bones was broadcast in Japan on TV Tokyo from April 2008 to March 2009. The series has also spawned a drama CD, an art book, and three video games. A spin-off manga series, titled Soul Eater Not!, was serialized in Monthly Shōnen Gangan from January 2011 to November 2014. Soul Eater was licensed for distribution in North America by Yen Press; it was serialized in Yen Press' Yen Plus manga anthology starting in July 2008, and the first manga volume was released in October 2009. The anime series has been licensed by Funimation.

The Soul Eater manga had 19.6 million copies in circulation as of July 2019. Both the manga and anime series have been overall well received, specially for its art style and Gothic setting, often compared by critics to Tim Burton's works like The Nightmare Before Christmas. The series, however, has been criticized for its use of fanservice and similarity to other  shōnen series.

Synopsis

Setting

Soul Eater is set at  —  for short — located in the fictional Death City in Nevada, United States. The school is run by Shinigami, also known as Death, as a training facility for humans with the ability to transform into weapons, as well as the wielders of those weapons, called . Attending this school are Maka Albarn and her scythe partner, Soul Eater; assassin Black Star and his partner, Tsubaki Nakatsukasa, who turns into various ninja weapons; and Shinigami's son, Death the Kid, and his pistol partners, Liz and Patty Thompson. The meister students' goal is to have their weapons absorb the souls of 99 evil humans and one witch, which dramatically increases the weapon's power and turns them into "death scythes" used by Shinigami.

Plot
Medusa and her cohorts attack DWMA to revive Asura, the first kishin who nearly plunged the entire world into madness before being sealed beneath DWMA by Shinigami. Despite the combined efforts of Maka, Black Star, and Death the Kid, Medusa's group successfully revives Asura, who leaves to spread chaos around the world after a brief battle with Shinigami. Medusa is seemingly killed by meister and DWMA teacher Franken Stein, while Crona surrenders to DWMA and enrolls there.

As a result of Asura's spreading madness, Medusa's sister Arachne comes out of hiding and reforms her organization, Arachnophobia, which poses a serious threat to DWMA. Shinigami calls in death scythes from around the world to aid in the fight against Arachnophobia. During this time, Medusa reappears with her soul possessing the body of a young girl, and forms a truce with DWMA so they can annihilate Arachnophobia together. The DWMA students and Medusa's entourage infiltrate Arachnophobia's headquarters, where Maka kills Arachne, only for Medusa to betray DWMA, possess Arachne's body, and brainwash Crona into rejoining her. Meanwhile, Death the Kid is captured by Noah, an artificial construct created from the Book of Eibon. Following this, Maka uses Arachne's soul to turn Soul into a death scythe. The duo become part of the newly formed meister unit Spartoi along with their friends, who rescue Death the Kid and defeat Noah.

Crona resurfaces in a city in Russia, destroying it and the death scythe stationed there, before being provoked by Medusa into killing her and getting taken by insanity. Maka is ordered by Shinigami to hunt down Crona; while searching for Crona with her powers, she unwittingly detects Asura's location on the cartoonish moon within the atmosphere. DWMA launches an attack on the moon to defeat Asura, aided by the witches after Death the Kid convinces them to establish a temporary alliance. During the battle, Crona absorbs Asura's body before being overtaken by him. Maka, Black Star, and Death the Kid eventually restore Crona's sanity and defeat Asura by sealing him on the moon with his own blood; Crona willingly remains with Asura to keep him imprisoned, and Maka promises to one day rescue Crona. The DWMA forces return to Earth, where Death the Kid becomes the new Shinigami following his father's death, and establishes a peace treaty with the witches.

Production
After the end of his first manga series, B.Ichi, Atsushi Ohkubo created a one-shot story called "Soul Eater" published in June 2003 by Gangan Powered. Japanese readers were so fascinated by it that Ohkubo created two other one-shots called "Black Star" and "Death the Kid", published in September and November 2003, respectively. Since the results were high, the editor of Gangan Comics asked Ohkubo to create a series from his one-shots which became the introductory chapters to Soul Eater.

In an interview, Ohkubo said that the series was greatly inspired by ideas from Tim Burton's animations, and by concepts from J. K. Rowling's Harry Potter. Ohkubo also stated he decided to make the main protagonist of the series, Maka Albarn, a female to differ from the traditional male hero found in most shōnen manga, and paired her and the other main characters with those of the opposite sex to demonstrate an equal representation of gender. He also said the series' title, Soul Eater, was intended to refer to Asura and his desire to eat innocent souls, and not to the character, Soul "Eater" Evans. Ohkubo has explained that, when he began Soul Eater, he already had the plot and details like the DWMA fully formed and shared with his editors. He thought too many manga had characters who were developed through flashbacks, which he considered too clever. Therefore, he decided to develop his characters in the present rather than referring to their pasts, and to focus on "action and momentum," so he could "write freely".

Media

Manga

Soul Eater started in Square Enix's shōnen manga magazine Monthly Shōnen Gangan on May 12, 2004, and finished after a nine-year run in the magazine on August 12, 2013. Square Enix compiled the series' 113 individual chapters into twenty-five tankōbon volumes released under their Gangan Comics imprint in Japan between June 22, 2004, and December 12, 2013. Square Enix republished the series in a seventeen-volume kanzenban edition, titled Soul Eater: The Perfect Edition, released from July 12, 2019, to March 12, 2020.

The manga has been licensed by Yen Press for distribution in English in North America. The manga was initially serialized in Yen Press' Yen Plus anthology magazine; the first issue went on sale on July 29, 2008. The first English volume of the manga was published on October 27, 2009. The last volume was published on March 24, 2015. In July 2019, Square Enix announced the English release of Soul Eater: The Perfect Edition. The first volume was released on July 28, 2020.

Another manga series which ran alongside the main series, titled , was serialized in Monthly Shōnen Gangan from January 12, 2011, to November 10, 2014. Five tankōbon volumes were released between September 22, 2011, and December 22, 2014. Soul Eater Not! has been licensed by Yen Press in North America. The five volumes were published between July 24, 2012, and August 4, 2015.

Drama CD
A drama CD was released on August 31, 2005 by Square Enix titled . The CD came bundled with an art book and a script of the CD dialogue. Of the cast used for the drama CD, only Black Star's voice actress Yumiko Kobayashi was retained for the anime voice cast.

Anime

A 51-episode anime adaptation was directed by Takuya Igarashi and produced by Bones, Aniplex, Dentsu, Media Factory, and TV Tokyo; Bones and Aniplex were responsible for the animation and music production respectively. The scenario writer was Akatsuki Yamatoya who based the anime's story on Ohkubo's original concept. Character design was headed by Yoshiyuki Ito, with overall art direction by Norifumi Nakamura. The anime's conceptual design was done by Shinji Aramaki. The episodes aired on TV Tokyo between April 7, 2008, and March 30, 2009, and two animated specials aired on May 29 and June 1, 2008. The series aired in two versions: the regular evening broadcast and a late-night "Soul Eater Late Show" version, which included special footage. The dual broadcast of the series was billed as the "world's first evening and late-night resonance broadcast". The "resonance" term refers to a story concept in which Maka and her living weapon partner, Soul Eater, achieve maximum power by synchronizing their souls. Media Factory collected the episodes in thirteen DVDs, released from August 22, 2008, to August 25, 2009. The series was rebroadcast on TV Tokyo, under the title , on September 30, 2010, featuring new opening and closing themes. Media Factory and Kadokawa brought the two previous Blu-ray box sets together into one box set released on February 26, 2014.

In North America, the anime has been licensed by Funimation, who released the series in four half-season DVD box sets starting with the first volume in February 2010. The anime made its North American television debut when it aired on the Funimation Channel on September 6, 2010. It also aired on Adult Swim's Toonami block from February 17, 2013.

Video games
Three Soul Eater video games were produced. The first,  is an action-adventure video game exclusively for the Wii and developed by Square Enix with Bones. It was released on September 25, 2008 in Japan. A soundtrack called  was released as a pre-order bonus CD. This game is only compatible with Japanese Wii systems.

The second game,  is an action game produced by Namco Bandai Games for the Nintendo DS and was released on October 23, 2008. Despite being created by two different companies, there are similarities between the Nintendo Wii game and the Nintendo DS game. It is a third-person hack-and-slash game.

The third game,  is a fighting game developed by BEC and produced by Namco Bandai Games for the PlayStation 2 and PlayStation Portable, and was released on January 29, 2009. This game follows the story line of the first 24 episodes of the anime series and allows the player to engage in the training and battles the characters experienced first hand. Along with new costumes and items, the player gets to experience the minds and wardrobes of each playable character.

Music
Six pieces of theme music are used for the episodes: two opening themes and four closing themes. The first opening theme is "Resonance" by T.M.Revolution for the first 30 episodes, and the single was released on June 11, 2008. The second opening theme is "Papermoon" by Tommy heavenly6 from episode 31 onward; the single was released on December 10, 2008 by DefStar Records. The first closing theme is "I Wanna Be" by Stance Punks for the first 13 episodes and the 51 episode; the single was released on June 4, 2008. The second closing theme is "Style" by Kana Nishino from episode 14 to 26; the single was released on August 13, 2008 by Sony Music Entertainment Japan. The final closing theme is "Strength" by Abingdon Boys School from episode 40 through episode 50; the single was released on February 25, 2009. The anime rebroadcasting features two additional opening and closing themes.

The first character song maxi single sung by Chiaki Omigawa (Maka) and Kōki Uchiyama (Soul) was released on August 6, 2008 by Aniplex. The second single by Yumiko Kobayashi (Black Star) and Kaori Nazuka (Tsubaki) was released on September 3, 2008, and the third single by Mamoru Miyano (Kid), Akeno Watanabe (Liz), and Narumi Takahira (Patty) was released on October 1, 2008. Composed and produced by Taku Iwasaki, two CD soundtracks have been released for the Soul Eater anime series. Soul Eater Original Soundtrack 1 was released on August 27, 2008 with 20 tracks, and Soul Eater Original Soundtrack 2 was released on March 18, 2009 with 22 tracks by Aniplex. The theme song for Soul Eater: Monotone Princess is "Soul's Crossing" sung by T.M.Revolution, and is included on the "Resonance" single.

Reception

Manga
Soul Eater was the 7th best-selling manga in 2008, with 3,076,351 copies sold. As of October 2012, the manga had over 13 million copies in circulation. As of April 2018, the manga had sold 18.2 million copies worldwide. As of July 2019, the manga had 19.6 million copies in circulation.

In her review of the first volume, Danielle Leigh of Comic Book Resources wrote that it is "stylish and fun", favorably comparing Ohkubo's art to Tim Burton's The Nightmare Before Christmas and The Corpse Bride, which considered paired quite well with references to Anglo-American spooks and horror legends as Jack the Ripper and Frankenstein. Leigh, however, criticized the series for its excessive use of fanservice, and considered that it clashes terribly with the series "pattern oriented, with very little depth" art style. Penny Kenny of Manga Life, gave the first volume a "B+". Kenny praised the series for its action scenes and variety of art styles, commenting that its panels "could have come out of Blade of the Immortal, while others are very Yu-Gi-Oh like", and that others "share the same sensibilities as Tim Burton's The Nightmare Before Christmas", adding that Ohkubo uses a "nice mix of standard action, comic, horror, and deformed design styles that blend together surprisingly well". Julian Gnam of Otaku USA praised the weapon meister/demon weapon partnerships presented in the story, but criticized the series' fanservice and overall found its plot "conventional", adding that it could come off cliché to the "more jaded manga veteran", stating although, that this makes the series accessible to casual readers. Reviewing the second volume, Chris Zimmerman of Comic Book Bin gave it a 7.5 out of 10. Zimmerman commended the series for its action sequences and wrote that the character designs are "thoughtful and creative", but criticized it for its lack of character development, prioritizing single chapter fights, and making it similar to other shōnen series. Reviewing the first two volumes, Shaenon Garrity of About.com gave the series 2 out of 5 stars. She praised the manga's setting, describing it as a "hyperkinetic Halloween world that's equal parts Shaman King, JoJo's Bizarre Adventure, and The Nightmare Before Christmas", but stated that "snazzy visuals can't compensate for the bland characters and meandering story". Garrity concluded that the series' popularity comes from its anime adaptation, adding that it is "fun to look at, bright and vibrant and visually imaginative", and in contrast, the original manga is "a lot less fun to sit down and read".

Reviewing the first volume of Soul Eater: The Perfect Edition, Nicholas Dupree of Anime News Network gave it a B+. Dupree wrote that the series holds an inherent charm to its world and characters that is hard to find anywhere else, adding that the key is its "spooky, Spirit Halloween-esque design sensibilities". He pointed out, however, that the comedy did not age well, stating that the main characters' gimmicks become repetitive and unfunny, and he felt that its use of sexual humor and fanservice is "questionable at best", and would not blame uninitiated readers if they drop the series for it "being too much". Dupree concluded: "for whatever warts it bears 15 years later, there's still nothing quite like Soul Eater out there".

Anime
In her 2008 Anime Preview Guide, Casey Brienza of Anime News Network wrote; "Though Soul Eater should not be surprising anyone with its standard tournament plot structure, it has some serious style to burn. Like D.Gray-man it is deeply indebted to Tim Burton's idiosyncratic gothic-fantasy imagery (think Beetlejuice and Nightmare Before Christmas), but this series does, if possible, execute it better". Jacob Hope Chapman of the same website describes the series as "dark but lively, visually imaginative, explosive great fun". James Brusuelas of Animation World Network wrote positively about the series, stating; "this anime knows exactly what it is: fun! The result: a series that takes the guilt out of your guilty pleasure". Holly Ellingwood of activeAnime praised the anime series, and wrote that "It is different, exciting and unexpected at various turns. A large part of its uniqueness and thrills have to do with the original animation style. It is zany while at times being creepy at whim. It is stylin' from start to finish!". Sandra Scholes of the same website, wrote that its story is "full of comedy, fun and dark humour in a Gothic vein", also comparing the series to D.Gray-man and Bleach, and its art style to Gorillaz's videos. Scholes concluded; "If these type of dark fantasy anime grips you then you've seen nothing yet – it's the one that holds the audience right till the end!". Chris Zimmerman of ComicBookBin gave the series "A−" rating. Zimmerman wrote that Soul Eater follows the shōnen conventions of many other series, but it stands out due to its "unrelenting humor and otherworldly feel", in addition to studio Bones "knack for cinematic design and eye pleasing animation". In his A+ review of Soul Eater: the Meister Collection Blu-ray, Zimmerman wrote that the series "embraces its shonen origins with flashy fights and themes of friendship while relying on lush animation and a colorful cast of characters that range from ultra serious to nonsensical".

Jason Green of Anime News Network, wrote that the series "explores the imposing concept of death gods in a tone that's less Death Note and more Gurren Lagann". Green pointed out the Western references presented in the series, with characters named after Jack the Ripper, The Blair Witch Project, Al Capone, Syd Barrett and Frankenstein. Paul Champan of Otaku USA noted as well the series' Western influence, as it is seen in the presentation of the witches and monsters, its nods to American horror films and its different architectures and locations. Regarding the anime series finale, Chapman wrote; "The conclusion and the denouement of the Soul Eater anime are adequate. The ending may not be mind-blowingly original, but it gives me everything that I require to be satisfied and it leaves me with the warm feeling of seeing the characters that I care about accomplish a worthy goal". Champan concluded that "Soul Eater is a solid addition to the collection of any anime fan who likes heroic action with a taste of the sinister and the macabre mixed in". Serdar Yegulalp of About.com, said that the series last episodes "unleash some gloriously absurd wide-scale action that tap into giant-robot stories like Gurren Lagann or Evangelion".

Writing for the Los Angeles Times, Charles Solomon ranked the series the sixth best anime on his "Top 10". Serdar Yegulalp listed Soul Eater on his "Course of Anime For Newcomers". Writing for Crunchyroll, Kara Dennison included Soul Eater on a list of "Five Creepy Anime for Your Halloween Party Playlist". Stephanie Donaldson and Jacki Jing of Anime News Network, listed the series on their list of "5 Anime That Need a Reboot, Now!".

Soul Eater was one of the Jury Recommended Works at the 12th Japan Media Arts Festival in 2008.

References

External links
Manga official website  
Anime official website 
Soul Eater  at TV Tokyo 
Soul Eater: Monotone Princess video game official website 
Soul Eater: Plot of Medusa video game official website 
Soul Eater: Battle Resonance video game official website 
Soul Eater at Funimation

 
2000s animated television series
2003 manga
2008 Japanese television series debuts
2008 video games
2009 Japanese television series endings
2009 video games
Action-adventure games
Action anime and manga
Anime series based on manga
Aniplex
Bandai Namco games
Bones (studio)
Comics about death
Dark comedy anime and manga
Dark fantasy anime and manga
Exorcism in anime and manga
Funimation
Gangan Comics manga
Medialink
Nintendo DS games
Fiction about personifications of death
PlayStation 2 games
PlayStation Portable games
Sharp Point Press titles
Shinigami in anime and manga
Shōnen manga
Square Enix franchises
Television shows set in Nevada
Toonami
TV Tokyo original programming
Video games based on anime and manga
Video games developed in Japan
Wii games
Witchcraft in anime and manga
Witchcraft in television
Witchcraft in written fiction
Yen Press titles